Thoby Priory was a priory in Essex, England. It was first noted as existing during the term of Robert de Sigello as Ginges; it was later named Gingestobye after its prior and then Thoby. It was dissolved on 15 February 1525 by John Alen.

References

Monasteries in Essex